The Glacier Strait is a natural waterway through the Canadian Arctic Archipelago within Qikiqtaaluk Region, Nunavut, Canada. It separates Ellesmere Island (to the north) from Coburg Island (to the south). To the north-east it opens into Baffin Bay, and to the south-west into the Jones Sound.

Straits of Qikiqtaaluk Region